The year 1948 was the 167th year of the Rattanakosin Kingdom of Thailand. It was the third year in the reign of King Bhumibol Adulyadej (Rama IX), and is reckoned as year 2491 in the Buddhist Era.

Incumbents
King: Bhumibol Adulyadej
Crown Prince: (vacant)
Prime Minister: 
 until 8 April: Khuang Aphaiwong
 starting 8 April: Plaek Phibunsongkhram
Supreme Patriarch: Vajirananavongs

Events

Births

Deaths

References

 
Years of the 20th century in Thailand
Thailand